The Symphony No. 4 is the fourth symphony by the Scottish composer James MacMillan.  The work was composed in celebration of the conductor Donald Runnicles's 60th birthday.  It was premiered at The Proms on August 3, 2015, by the BBC Scottish Symphony Orchestra under Donald Runnicles.

Composition
The symphony has a duration of roughly 37 minutes and is composed in one continuous movement.  Though MacMillan had conceived the symphony years earlier, he did not begin work on the piece until late 2014.  The work quotes passages from Missa Dum Sacrum Mysterium by the Renaissance composer Robert Carver.  MacMillan described the use of Carver's work in an interview with The Scotsman, remarking, "He's been such a big figure in my adult life as a composer in Scotland, and I've always wanted to acknowledge some kind of debt. I love the austerity of his music, but also its complexity. I've incorporated some of his ideas into the structure of the symphony and wound my own music around it."

Instrumentation
The work is scored for an orchestra comprising two flutes (2nd doubling piccolo), two oboes (2nd doubling cor anglais), two clarinets (2nd doubling bass clarinet), bassoon, contrabassoon, four horns, three trumpets, three trombones, tuba, timpani, three percussionists, harp, piano (doubling celesta), and strings.

Reception
Reviewing the world premiere, Tim Ashley of The Guardian lauded the piece, writing:
The work was also praised by David Nice of The Arts Desk, Nick Trend of The Daily Telegraph, and Simon Cummings of 5:4.

See also
List of compositions by James MacMillan

References

Symphonies by James MacMillan
2015 compositions
MacMillan 4